Neptis mixophyes, or Holland's clubbed sailer, is a butterfly in the family Nymphalidae. It is found in eastern Sierra Leone, Ivory Coast, Ghana, Nigeria, Cameroon, Gabon, the Republic of the Congo, Equatorial Guinea and the Democratic Republic of the Congo. The habitat consists of wetter forests.

The larvae feed on Dalhousiea africana and Petersianthus species.

References

Butterflies described in 1892
mixophyes
Butterflies of Africa